David Herbert Lipson (May 3, 1929 – December 25, 2017) was an American magazine publisher and longtime owner of Philadelphia and Boston magazines. Born in Philadelphia to newspaper owner S. Arthur Lipson, he graduated from Lafayette College in 1952, and joined his father at what would become Philadelphia. He became publisher in 1963 and owner in 1968. He purchased Boston in 1970, and launched Manhattan, inc. in 1984. He married three times and had three children. He died in Philadelphia at the age of 88.

References

1929 births
2017 deaths
American magazine publishers (people)
Lafayette College alumni
Businesspeople from Philadelphia
20th-century American businesspeople